Sounddogs.com, Inc. is a commercial online library of sound effects based in Marina Del Rey, California, with offices in Canada, Argentina, and Uruguay. It is the first and largest online sound effects and production music library on the Internet launched in May 1997. , 708,636 sound effects and production music tracks are available for immediate download or on hard drive or CD. Downloads are available in AIFF, WAV, and MP3 formats. Sounddogs started as a sound design and editorial company in 1990 and has contributed to more than 150 feature films and earned multiple awards and nominations from the BAFTA Award, Primetime Emmy Award and Golden Reel Awards.

Company history
In 1990,  Gregory King and Nelson Ferrera formed the original Sound Dogs Inc. as a sound editorial company in Toronto, Canada. In 1991, Robert Nokes was appointed as an assistant of King.
In 1995 Greg King moved to Los Angeles along with Rob Nokes. Paul Huntsman of Todd-AO introduced them to Robert Grieve, who six years earlier had declined to become a founding partner of Soundelux. Together they formed "Sound Dogs USA" in Los Angeles, California. After a year, they launched Sounddogs.com on May 1, 1997, a large online sound effects archive as a marketing tool with Picture Editors. In 1998 they received invitation for a meeting with Kleiner Perkins, a Silicon Valley Venture Capital firm. They later worked with giant companies like Apple, Microsoft, Sun Microsystems, Avid Technology, and Digital River. Around 1999, Nelson Ferreira partnered with Stephen Barden at Sound Dogs Toronto. In late 2001, Sound Dogs Inc. (King, Grieve) and Sounddogs.com (Nokes) split amicably and remain close working partners. Sound Dogs New York was started by Stephen Barden around 2005. In the late 2000s King formed a sound design firm called The Dawgs Sound Design, which later became King SoundWorks. Currently, there are three separately owned Sounddogs companies: Sounddogs.com, owned by Rob Nokes; King SoundWorks (formally known as SoundDogs USA), owned by Greg King and SoundDogs Canada, owned by Nelson Ferreira.

Content partners 
Since 2001, the company signed co-distribution deal and partnerships with many sound designer and companies with a view to providing the best selection possible.
Partners of Sounddogs include: Charles Maynes, Elliot Koretz, AMG, Airborne Sound Library,  Bobby Mackston, Casablanca, Coll Anderson, Copra Studios, Craig Henighan, Dan O’Connell, Digiffects, The Hollywood Edge, Elements, Farts Dot Com, Hanna Barbera, Interplay, Nightingale Mobile, Nightingale Voice Box, Nokes Library, Point One Sound, Ripe, Rob Nokes Horse Racing Collection, Sonic Science, Sound Ideas SFX, Sound HOG, Sound Label, Sonospheres, Sounddogs, Soundminer, The Anarchist Cookbook, The Recordist, Tomahawk Films, Trak Works, Valentino, and Zak Sound.

Acquisition 

In November 2004, Rob Nokes acquired the sound library and trademark of SoundStorm, a sound editorial company nominated for eight Academy Awards. SoundStorm's corporate predecessor was a company called Walla Works, which had employed the founding partners of Soundelux, another sound editorial company.
On November 17, 2014, the Todd-Soundelux Trademarks (Todd AO and Soundelux) and Copyrights (Sound Effects Library) were also acquired in Federal Bankruptcy Court by Rob Nokes of Sounddogs.com, Inc. Nokes purchased all of Todd-Soundelux's library assets and trademarks, which included The Hollywood Edge. On January 1, 2015, Nokes sold the Hollywood Edge Sound Effects to the Sound Ideas.

Staff 
 Rob Nokes, President and CEO, Sound recordist, Supervising sound editor (1995–present)

 Former staffs
 Gregory King, Co founder, Supervising sound editor (1990-2001)
 Nelson Ferreira, Co founder, Supervising sound editor (1990-1999)
 Robert Grieve, Supervising sound editor
 Craig Henighan, Supervising sound editor
 Stephen Barden, Supervising sound editor
 Yann Delpuech, Supervising sound editor
 Darren King, Supervising sound editor
 Paula Fairfield, Sound effect editor
 John Switzer, Former Vice president 
 Paul Virostek, Former Vice president

Filmography 

 Backstrom (2015) ... Supervising sound editor (12 episodes)
 Big Sky (2015) ... Sound library
 The Rover (2014) ... Field sound effects 
 Bones (2005-2015) (TV Series) ... Supervising sound editor (204 episodes)
 Salem (2014) ... Supervising sound editor (2 episodes)
 Noah (2014) ...  Field sound effects
 Someone Marry Barry (2014) ... Supervising sound editor
 Planes (2013) ... Supervising sound editor 
 The Finder (2012) ... Supervising sound editor (6 episodes)
 Prince of Persia: The Sands of Time (2010) ... Field sound effects
 We Bought a Zoo (2010) ... Sound effects recording
 Insidious (2010) ... ADR mixing 
 The Princess and the Frog (2009) ... Sound effects field recording
 Ghosts of Girlfriends Past (2009) ... Sound effects field recording
 X-Men Origins: Wolverine (2009) ... Sound effects field recording
 Race to Witch Mountain (2009) ... Sound effects field recording
 Jonas Brothers: The 3D Concert Experience (2009) ... Sound effects field recording
 Beverly Hills Chihuahua (2008) ... Sound effects recording
 The X Files: I Want to Believe (2008) ... Sound effects recording
 Generation Kill (2008) ... Sound effects recording
 The Spiderwick Chronicles (2008) ... Sound effects field recording
 Hannah Montana & Miley Cyrus: Best of Both Worlds Concert (2008) ... Sound effects field recording
 John Adams (2008 TV Miniseries) ... Additional sound design (2 episodes)
 The Game Plan (2007) ... Sound effects field recording
 3:10 to Yuma (2007) ... Sound effects field recording
 Mongol (2007) ... Additional sound effects library
 Fantastic Four: Rise of the Silver Surfer (2007) ... Sound effects field recording
 Blue State (2007) ... Sound effects recording
 Blades of Glory (2007) ... Sound effects field recording
 Because I Said So (2007) ... Sound effects field recording
 Broken English (2007) ...  Supervising sound editor 
 The Fountain (2006) ...  Supervising sound editor
 The Santa Clause 3: The Escape Clause (2006) ... Additional sound effects library
 Flicka (2006) ... Additional sound effects library
 The Guardian (2006) ... Sound effects field recording
 Gridiron Gang (2006) ... Additional sound recording
 Invincible (2006) ... Field recording
 The Host (2006) ... Additional sound effects
 The Shaggy Dog (2006) ...  Field recording
 Glory Road (2006) ...  Additional sound recording
 Cheong yeon (2005) ...  Additional sound
 Stealth (2005) ...  sound effects recording
 Just Friends (2005) ... Supervising sound editor 
 Dreamer (2005) ... Additional sound recording
 The Dukes of Hazzard (2005) ...  Sound effects editing
 Nomad (2005 film) (2005) ... Supervising sound editor
 Million Dollar Baby (2004) ... Additional sound recording
 Miracle (2004) ... Supervising sound editor
 Seabiscuit (2003) ... Additional sound
 Frankie and Johnny Are Married (2003) ... Supervising sound editor
 My Baby's Daddy (2003) ...  Supervising sound editor 
 Big Momma's House (2003) ...  Supervising sound editor
 Red Dragon (2002) ...  Supervising sound editor
 Ali (2001) ... Post sound technical planning 
 The Road to El Dorado (2000) ... Supervising sound editor
 Requiem for a Dream (2000) ... Supervising sound editor, Sound effect
 Fantasia 2000 (2000) ... Supervising sound editor
 The Family Man (2000) ... Supervising sound editor 
 Return to Me (2000) ... Supervising sound editor 
 Dungeons & Dragons (2000) ... Supervising sound editor 
 The Insider (1999) ... Supervising sound editor
 Mumford (1999) ... Supervising sound editor 
 Dick (1999) ... Sound design 
 Water Damage (1999) ... Sound editing 
 Bride of Chucky (1998) ... Supervising sound editor 
 Very Bad Things (1998) ... Supervising sound editor
 Jack Frost (1997) ... Supervising sound editor
 Turbulence (1997) ... Supervising sound editor
 Waiting for Guffman (1996) ... Post sound technical 
 Ghosts of Mississippi (1996) ... Supervising sound editor
 The Cable Guy (1996) ... Supervising sound editor
 The Harvest (1993) ... Supervising sound editor
 Dark Horse (1992) ... Supervising sound editor
 Dracula: The Series (1990) ... Supervising sound editor

Awards and recognitions

See also 
 SoundStorm
 Todd-AO
 Soundelux

References

External links 
Sounddogs.com website
SoundDogs Canada website
King SoundWorks website

Sound archives in the United States
Companies based in Los Angeles County, California
Film sound production
Internet properties established in 1997